Karvia Church is a wooden church in Karvia, Finland. It was built in 1789–1798. The bell tower which is located in front of the church was completed 1806. The church has been extended and renovated several times in the course of the years.

Wooden churches in Finland
18th-century Lutheran churches
Buildings and structures in Satakunta
18th-century churches in Finland